Lagos is the largest city and commercial capital  of Nigeria.

Lagos may also refer to:

Places

France
 Lagos, Pyrénées-Atlantiques, a commune in the département of Pyrénées-Atlantiques

Greece
 Lagos, Evros, a settlement in the regional unit of Evros
 Lagos, Xanthi, a settlement in the regional unit of Xanthi

Mexico
 Lagos de Moreno, a city and municipality in Jalisco

Nigeria
 Lagos State, a state in south-western Nigeria
 Lagos Colony, former British Colony in south-western Nigeria
 Lagos Island, in the city of Lagos

Portugal
 Lagos, Portugal, a town on the Algarve coast

Turkey
 Lagos (Phrygia), a town of ancient Phrygia in Asia Minor

People
 Given name
 Lagus, father of Ptolemy I Soter
 Lagos Kunga (born 1998), American soccer player

 Surname
 Anastasios Lagos (born 1992), Greek footballer
 Buzz Lagos, American soccer coach
 Cristhian Lagos (born 1984), Costa Rican footballer
 Diego Lagos (born 1986), Argentine footballer
 Edith Lagos (1962–1982), Peruvian rebel
 Ernesto Lagos (born 1930), Chilean athlete
 Ioannis Lagos (born 1972), Greek politician
 Manny Lagos (born 1971), American soccer player
 Mariana Lagos (born 1992), Chilean field hockey player
 Mauricio Lagos (born 1984), Chilean footballer
 Orlando Lagos (1913–2007), Chilean photographer
 Óscar Lagos (born 1973), Honduran footballer
 Ovidio Lagos (1825–1891), Argentine journalist
 Panagiotis Lagos (born 1985), Greek footballer
 Pedro Lagos (1832–1884), Chilean infantry commander
 Penelope Lagos, American actress and model
 Ricardo Lagos (born 1938), President of the Republic of Chile (2000–2006)
 Rosângela Lagos (born 1980), Cape Verdean basketball player

Other uses
 Lagos (Buffyverse), a fictional demon in the TV series Buffy the Vampire Slayer
 Lagos (jewelry), American jewelry company
 , a Battle-class destroyer of the Royal Navy
 Lagos (band), Venezuelan band

See also
 Lago (disambiguation)
 Los Lagos (disambiguation)